Great Expectations is a 1974 film made for television based on the Charles Dickens 1861 novel of the same name.  It was directed by Joseph Hardy, with screenwriter Sherman Yellen and music by Maurice Jarre, starring Michael York as Pip, Simon Gipps-Kent as Young Pip and Sarah Miles as Estella. The production, for Transcontinental Films and ITC, was made for US television and released to cinemas in the UK. It broke with tradition by having the same actress (the thirty-three-year-old Sarah Miles) play both the younger and older Estella. The film was shot by Freddie Young. It was filmed in Eastmancolor and it was entered into the 9th Moscow International Film Festival in 1975.

Plot summary

Cast
 Michael York as Pip
 Sarah Miles as Estella
 James Mason as Abel Magwitch
 Margaret Leighton as Miss Havisham
 Robert Morley as Uncle Pumblechook
 Anthony Quayle as Jaggers
 Joss Ackland as Joe Gargery
 Rachel Roberts as Mrs. Gargery
 Andrew Ray as Herbert Pocket
 Heather Sears as Biddy
 Simon Gipps-Kent as Young Pip
 James Faulkner as Bentley Drummle
 Peter Bull as Wemmick
 John Clive as Mr. Wopsle
 Patsy Smart as Mrs. Wopsle
 Maria Charles as Sarah Pocket

Production and reception
CinemaTV Today reported in 1974, however, that "in an unprecedented move, the bulk of the score for Sir Lew Grade and NBC's  musical version of Great Expectations has been scrapped seven weeks into shooting". Films Illustrated reported  that the film would contain "only a traditional score by Maurice Jarre" after the idea of a film musical version had been dropped. In 1995, Michael York said "we found when we started  putting it together [that] the songs interrupted the narrative flow of the piece".

Critics' comments were generally negative. The Listener: "Everything is wrong about it with a sort of dedicated, inspired wrongness that, in itself, is breath-taking". The Monthly Film Bulletin thought director Hardy and screenwriter Yellen had reduced "one of Dickens' most subtle and complex novels to an insipid seasonal confection". Gordon Gow, writing in Films and Filming thought it odd to have "Pip divided between two players, [while] his beloved Estella should be played by one actress the whole way through".

Brian McFarlane, writing in a 2008 study of screen adaptations of Great Expectations, criticised the film for its tendency to give way to "clichés of sentimentality" and assured the director, who had expressed a hope that people would not feel the necessity of comparing it with David Lean's version that, "he need not have worried: no one would have spoken of them in the same breath. It's not just Lean's film with which it would not stand comparison but with several superior TV mini-series too". McFarlane  expressed some admiration however for Margaret Leighton's  interpretation of the jilted Miss Havisham: "there is a potent sense of the perverse pleasure she takes in watching Estella humiliate Pip, and, during a later visit, of real cruelty in her telling him, 'You've lost her'. Leighton injected 'a necessary bitterness into these scenes. The critic David Parker, writing for the BFI Screenonline website, praised Joss Ackland's interpretation of Joe Gargery: "Ackland manages to  create a subtle blend of individual simplicity and moral fortitude that seems to capture the essential role the village blacksmith fills in the narrative."

References

External links
 
 
 
 

1974 films
1974 drama films
American drama films
British drama films
Films shot at EMI-Elstree Studios
Films based on Great Expectations
Television shows based on Great Expectations
Films directed by Joseph Hardy (director)
Television shows shot at EMI-Elstree Studios
1970s English-language films
1970s American films
1970s British films